High Peak is a parliamentary constituency represented in the House of Commons of the UK Parliament since 2019 by Robert Largan, a Conservative.

The constituency is in north west Derbyshire and based in the heart of the Peak District, including the towns of Buxton, Glossop and New Mills.

Since the 1966 general election, the seat has been somewhat of a bellwether, with only three exceptions: at the February and October 1974 general elections the seat was won by the Conservative Party when the Labour Party won the most seats nationally, and at the 2017 general election when the seat was won by Labour but the Conservatives won the most seats nationally.

Boundaries 

1885–1918: The Borough of Glossop, and the Sessional Divisions of Buxton, Chapel-en-le-Frith, and Glossop.

1918–1950: The Boroughs of Buxton and Glossop, the Urban District of New Mills, the Rural Districts of Glossop Dale and Hayfield, and parts of the Rural Districts of Bakewell and Chapel-en-le-Frith.

1950–1983: The Boroughs of Buxton and Glossop, the Urban Districts of New Mills and Whaley Bridge, and the Rural District of Chapel-en-le-Frith.

1983–2010: The Borough of High Peak, and the District of West Derbyshire wards of Bradwell, Hathersage and Tideswell.

2010–present: The Borough of High Peak.

The constituency covers much of northern Derbyshire and represents most of the west of the Peak District which encircles Buxton and Glossop. Crowden, Tintwistle and Woodhead (formerly within the boundaries of Cheshire and in the Stalybridge and Hyde constituency) were brought into the seat in the boundary changes for the 1983 general election. The constituency boundaries became co-terminous with the local government district at the 2010 general election.

Constituency profile
The rural Hope Valley and the town of Chapel-en-le-Frith have a Conservative majority, whereas the north western part of the constituency, in Glossop (especially the Manchester overspill estate of Gamesley), Hadfield and Tintwistle, are more Labour-inclined. The largest town of Buxton is often divided between the two main parties. Buxton itself is a spa town famed for its bottled water while Glossop has had a more industrial past. Tourism is a key industry in the constituency being in the Peak District, attracting visitors to its landscapes of peaks and reservoirs and other attractions such as the village of Castleton with its Blue John mine. The seat has considerable commuting connections by road and rail with Manchester (and the Hope Valley with Sheffield), rather than the East Midlands and Derby.

History
The seat was created in the Redistribution of Seats Act 1885. Since 1910, the seat has returned mostly Conservative MPs apart from during three periods. A Labour MP was elected for the first time in 1966, but was unseated at the next general election. Labour gained the seat at the 1997 general election and retained it at the following two general elections during the Blair ministry, but it was regained by the Conservatives at the 2010 general election. It was regained by Labour at the 2017 general election when Ruth George gained the seat, the first time Labour had won the High Peak seat without winning the overall general election in its history.

Members of Parliament

Elections

Elections in the 2020s

Elections in the 2010s

Elections in the 2000s

Elections in the 1990s

Elections in the 1980s

Elections in the 1970s

Elections in the 1960s

Elections in the 1950s

Elections in the 1940s

Elections in the 1930s
At the 1939 High Peak by-election, Hugh Molson was elected unopposed.

Elections in the 1920s

Election results 1885–1918

Elections in the 1880s

Elections in the 1890s

Elections in the 1900s

Elections in the 1910s 

General Election 1914–15:

Another General Election was required to take place before the end of 1915. The political parties had been making preparations for an election to take place and by July 1914, the following candidates had been selected; 
Unionist: Samuel Hill-Wood
Liberal: Oswald Partington

See also 
 List of parliamentary constituencies in Derbyshire

Notes

References
Specific

General
 Craig, F. W. S. (1983). British parliamentary election results 1918–1949 (3 ed.). Chichester: Parliamentary Research Services.
 Guardian Unlimited Politics (Election results from 1992 to the present)
 Politics Resources (Election results from 1931 to the present)

Peak District
Parliamentary constituencies in Derbyshire
Constituencies of the Parliament of the United Kingdom established in 1885